The tomb of Joan of Brabant was built between 1457 and 1458 by the bronze caster Jacob de Gerines after wooden models by the sculptor Jean Delemer. It was commissioned by Philip the Good for placement in the Carmelite monastery church in Brussels. The tomb damaged during the Calvinist iconoclasm in the years 1578 to 1585, but was restored in 1607.

It's design and build is attributed to Jacob van Gerines and Jean de le Mer, and its polychrome (paint) to Rogier van der Weyden.

The tomb was completely destroyed During the bombardment of Brussels between 13 and 15 August 1695 by the troops of King Louis XIV of France,  as was the Carmelite monastery church was destroyed.

References

Sources

 Campbell, Lorne. "The Tomb of Joanna, Duchess of Brabant". Renaissance Studies, volume 2, no. 2, 1988. 
 Pinchart, Alexandre. "La cour de Jeanne et de Wenceslas et les arts en Brabant, pendant la seconde moitié du XIVe siècle". In: Revue Trimestrielle 2 (1855) 2, S. 5–31 und Revue Trimestrielle 4 (1857)
 Scholten, Frits. "Isabella’s Weepers: Ten Statues from a Burgundian Tomb"'. Amsterdam: Rijksmuseum, 2007. 
 van 't Land, Karine . "Prince ende vrouwe der lande vorscreven. Hertogin Johanna van Brabant in de ogen van haar chroniqueur". In: Ex Tempore 17 (1998), pp. 97–118.

1450s sculptures
15th-century fashion
Tomb Sculptures from the Court of Burgundy